Trueblood is a surname. Notable people with the surname include:

 Benjamin Franklin Trueblood (1847–1916), American pacifist
 D. Elton Trueblood (1900–1994), American Quaker theologian
 Guerdon Trueblood (1933–2021), Costa Rican-American screenwriter
 Jeremy Trueblood (born 1983), American football player
 Kathryn Trueblood, American author
 Kenneth Nyitray Trueblood (1920–1998), American chemist
 Lyda Trueblood (1892–1958), American female suspected serial killer
 Mark Trueblood (born 1948), American astronomer and engineer
 Mary Esther Trueblood (1872–1939) was an American mathematician and sociologist
 Paul Trueblood (1935–2012), American pianist
 Robert M. Trueblood, chairman of the Trueblood Committee which attempted to set out the objectives of financial accounting
 Ted Trueblood (1913-1982), American outdoor writer and conservationist
 Thomas Trueblood (1856–1951), American professor of elocution and oratory and the first coach of the University of Michigan golf and debate teams
 Valerie Trueblood, American writer
 Wilbur Trueblood (1874–1937), American architect

See also
 True Blood, an American television series on HBO